S-Oil Corporation (hangul:에쓰-오일) is a petroleum and refinery company, headquartered in Seoul, South Korea. It was established in 1976 under its original name Iran-Korea petroleum company (hangul:한이석유). It produces petroleum, petrochemical, and lubricant products. The company was listed as a Fortune Global 500 company in 2009 (Rank 441). 

Corporate governance
, the CEO and Representative Director is Hussain A. Al-Qahtani.

Ownership
Saudi Aramco bought a 35% interest in August 1991, and increased it to 65% in 2014.  The common stock shares are traded on the Korea Exchange.

See also
 Economy of South Korea

References

External links
  (in English)
  (in Korean)

Companies based in Seoul
Non-renewable resource companies established in 1977
Oil companies of South Korea
Chemical companies of South Korea
Automotive fuel retailers
South Korean brands
Chemical companies established in 1977
South Korean companies established in 1977
Companies listed on the Korea Exchange